Margareta Gustafsdotter or Margareta Göstafsdotter (floruit 1324), was a Swedish noble landowner and abbess. She founded the convent of the Dominican order for females at Kalmar in 1299 and served as its first abbess.

Margareta Gustafsdotter belonged to the nobility as a member of the noble line Karl Gustavssons ätt, and is mentioned as a major land holder in 1291. In 1299, she donated her land to the first female abbey of the Dominican order in Sweden, which she founded in Kalmar, and became its first abbess. As such, she is last mentioned the 11 April 1324. The Kalmar Nunnery, as it was often called, has been described as a purely aristocratic convent, whose members lived on the allowance from the estates they brought with them as dowry, and functioned until it was dissolved in 1505.

References
 Historiskt-geografiskt och statistiskt lexikon öfver Sverige, Volym 1
 Historiskt-geografiskt och statistiskt lexikon öfver Sverige / Första Bandet. Inledning samt Text A och B
 Kalmar Slotts och Stads politiska Historia: Fem Delar AvGustav Volm Sylvande
 Gotland i blickpunkten: en kritisk överblick över nyare litteratur om gotländska ortnamn. Summary in English: Focus on Gotland; a critical survey of recent literature on Gotlandic place-names, Lars Alfvegren, Almqvist & Wiksell, 1961 - 86 sidor
 Det medeltida Sverige: Aspeland, Sevede, Tuna län, Volym 4

13th-century Swedish nobility
14th-century Swedish nobility
Swedish Roman Catholic abbesses
14th-century Swedish nuns
13th-century Swedish women
13th-century landowners